Seventh-day Adventists are the largest Protestant health care provider in the world, and operate more than 200 hospitals and medical facilities in over 25 countries. The following is a list hospitals owned by the General Conference of Seventh-day Adventists and independent hospital networks.

Seventh-day Adventist Hospitals

Former Adventist hospitals
 Auckland Adventist Hospital - Auckland, (sold)
 Battle Creek Sanitarium - Battle Creek, (sold to the federal government and became Percy Jones Army Hospital, currently it goes by the name Hart–Dole–Inouye Federal Center)
 Benghazi Adventist Hospital - Benghazi, (closed by the military government)
 Boston Regional Medical Center - Stoneham, (sold to Gutierrez Company)
 Central Texas Medical Center - San Marcos, (sold to Christus Santa Rosa Health System by AdventHealth and renamed CHRISTUS Santa Rosa Hospital-San Marcos)
 Chongchen Hospital - China, (closed by the Chinese Communist Party)
 Dalcross Adventist Hospital -Killara, (closed by Adventist HealthCare Limited)
 Florida Hospital Oceanside - Ormond Beach, (damaged by Hurricane Irma and years later AdventHealth had it demolished
 Fushan Hospital - China, (closed by the Chinese Communist Party)
 Guangzhou Sanitarium - Guangzhou, (closed by the Chinese Communist Party)
 Hackettstown Regional Medical Center - Hackettstown, (sold to Atlantic Health System by Adventist HealthCare and renamed Hackettstown Medical Center)
 Henan Hospital - China, (closed by the Chinese Communist Party)
 Jellico Community Hospital - Jellico, (formerly operated by Adventist Health System)
 Knowlton Sanitarium - Knowlton, (sold)
 Kondeng Hospital - China, (closed by the Chinese Communist Party)
 McClelan Memorial Hospital - Riverside, New Brunswick, (closed or sold)
 Naning Hospital - China, (closed by the Chinese Communist Party)
 North China Sanitarium - China, (closed by the Chinese Communist Party)
 Northwest Sanitarium - China, (closed by the Chinese Communist Party)
 North York Branson Hospital - Toronto, (sold to North York General Hospital and renamed Branson Ambulatory Care Centre)
 Paradise Valley Hospital - National City, (sold to Prime Healthcare Services) by Adventist Health 
 Parkview Adventist Medical Center - Brunswick, (sold to Mid Coast Health Services and renamed Parkview Medical Center)
 Rangoon Seventh-day Adventist Hospital - Yangon, (closed by the military government, currently Yangon ENT Hospital
 Rest Haven Hospital & Sanitarium - Sidney, (moved from an island to the mainland and is now operated as Rest Haven Lodge a retirement facility) 
 Saigon Adventist Hospital - Ho Chi Minh, (closed by the Communist government and now owned by Phú Nhuanân Red Cross Association) 
 Shanghai Sanitarium - Shanghai, (closed by the Chinese Communist Party)
 Shenyang Sanitarium - Shenyang, (closed by the Chinese Communist Party)
 Skodsborg Sanitarium - Skodsborg, (sold to Augustinus Foundation, currently it goes by the name Skodsborg Spa Hotel)
 Taishan Hospital - Taishan, (closed by the Chinese Communist Party and renamed Taishan City People's Hospital)
 Takoma Regional Hospital - Greeneville, (sold by Adventist Health System to Wellmont Health System)
 Tempe Community Hospital - Tempe, (sold by Adventist Health to Iasis Healthcare then renamed Tempe St. Luke's Hospital)
 Walla Walla General Hospital - Walla Walla, (closed by Adventist Health)
 Warburton Hospital - Warburton, (sold)
 Wei Chou Hospital - China, (closed by the Chinese Communist Party)
 Wuhan Sanitarium - Wuhan, (closed by the Chinese Communist Party)
 Youngberg Memorial Adventist Hospital - Singapore, (closed and was bought by the Salvation Army and turned into a thrift store)

See also

 List of Seventh-day Adventist colleges and universities
 List of Seventh-day Adventist secondary schools

Notes

References

External links
Adventist Directory Locate Adventist Entities
Adventist Yearbook The Official Organizational Directory

Seventh-day Adventist
List
Seventh-day Adventist Church-related lists